Bhoomigeetham is a 1993 Indian Malayalam film,  directed by Kamal and produced by Pavamani. The film stars Murali, Geetha, Jagathy Sreekumar and KPAC Lalitha in the lead roles. The film has musical score by Ouseppachan.

Cast

Murali as Thekkinkadu Krishnaprasad
Geetha as Indulekha
Jagathy Sreekumar as Adv. Ganesh Iyyer
Vijayakumar as Sethunathan
KPAC Lalitha as Rukmini
Nedumudi Venu as Balan Mashu
 Abubakker as Achutha Marar
Kunjunni Mash as himself
Mullanezhi as himself
Kaveri as Subhashini
N. F. Varghese as Gangadharan
Seetha as Ammukutti
Augustine as Minister Harischandra Nadar
Raveendran as Vijayan
Rizabawa as Chandradas
Sudheer as Doctor Philip
C. I. Paul as Chief Minister
Lal Jose as Journalist
V. K. Sreeraman as Central minister
Ravi Vallathol as Devan
Kozhikode Narayanan Nair as Sankara Marar
T. P. Madhavan as Driver Shivaraman
Meghanathan as Parameshwaran
Meena Ganesh as Student's mother
Lishoy as Police officer
Gomathi as Dakshyayani

Soundtrack
The music was composed by Ouseppachan.

Reception

In an interview with Manorama in 2015, director Kamal classified Bhoomigeetham as one of the movies he wished he didn't work on.

References

External links
 

1993 films
1990s Malayalam-language films
Films directed by Kamal (director)
Films scored by Ouseppachan